Jorge Alarcón can refer to:

 Jorge Alarcón (footballer) (born 1956), Ecuadorian footballer
 Jorge Alarcón (swimmer) (born 1969), Mexican swimmer